The Lone Star Producing Company 1–27 Bertha Rogers hole or well was an oil-exploratory hole drilled in Washita County, Oklahoma in 1974, and was the world's deepest hole until it was surpassed in 1979 by the Kola Superdeep Borehole, dug by the USSR.

The drilling was started October 25, 1972 and it took Lone Star a little over a year and a half to reach 31,441 feet (9,583 m) on April 13, 1974. During drilling, the well encountered enormous pressure – almost 25,000 psi (172,369 kPa). No commercial hydrocarbons were found before drilling hit a molten sulfur deposit, which solidified around the drill string, causing the drill pipe to twist-off and a loss of the bottom-hole assembly. The well was plugged back and completed in the Granite Wash from 11,000 to 13,200 feet as a natural gas producer.

According to publicly available well records from the Oklahoma Corporation Commission, the Bertha Rogers hole ceased production of natural gas in July 1997 and has since been plugged and abandoned.

References

Buildings and structures in Washita County, Oklahoma
Deepest boreholes
Structure of the Earth